

Second Division

FA Cup

Semi Final Line Up

Semi Final Line Up Replay

League Cup

Full Members Cup

References
 

Portsmouth F.C. seasons
Portsmouth